Chinlechelys ( meaning Chinle turtle) is an extinct genus of stem-turtle belonging to Testudinata. It lived in the Norian age of the Late Triassic and is the oldest turtle known from North America. Among turtles it is unique, mostly because of its very thin shell. The type and only species, C. tenertesta, was named and described with the genus by Walter G. Joyce et al. in 2009. It was probably terrestrial, and was found by Joyce et al. to be closely related to Proganochelys, another terrestrial testudinatan.

Discovery and naming
Chinlechelys is known from only one assigned specimen, the holotype NMMNH P-16697 (New Mexico Museum of Natural History and Science) recovered from the Norian Bull Canyon Formation (New Mexico, United States). The skeleton consists of the middle of the carapace, the left hypoplastron, rear ribs, a neck spine, isolated osteoderms, and portions of the bridge. The materials were collected separately over several years, but exhibit the same preservation, features, and are all from the same area, so they were assigned to the same individual.

Etymology
Chinlechelys tenertesta was named by Walter G. Joyce et al. in 2009. The generic name is derived from chinle, after the Triassic Chinle Group the holotype was found in, and chelys, Greek for "turtle". Tener and testa and based on the Latin words for "delicate" and "shell", respectively, based on the thinness of its shell.

Description
Chinlechelys is a unique turtle, and was preserved to have an extremely thin shell. The shell thickness makes Chinlechelys the thinnest-shelled turtle known from a fully grown shell. The other well-discussed materials of Chinlechelys are dermal osteoderms. Two prominent spines, from the neck region, are well-preserved. They were decidedly not from the edge of the shell, because large amounts of the region of the carapace they would be from were preserved. Also, the pair of osteoderms were unlikely to be from the tail, because of a comparison with Proganochelys. Some spines from the shell are known from Chinlechelys, but it was considered likely that they were extended fully around the shell because of their presence on Proganochelys.

Distinguishing characteristics
Chinlechelys can be distinguished from both derived amniotes and primitive turtles based on the below features, noticed by Joyce et al.: the presence of a plastron, carapace and multi-element neck and tail armour; dorsal centra hourglass-shaped, platycoelous, and with a distinct ventral keel; dorsal ribs in contact two dorsal vertebrae; the appearance of compressed dorsal ribs that are oriented vertically and only lightly associated with overlying dermal armour; a double contact between the dorsal vertebrae and dorsal ribs only incipient; the carapace and most of plastron laminar in thickness; a carapace with distinct medial ridge that widens towards the end; a plastron with a sloping inguinal notch; and neck armour prongs forming an angular cone.

Classification
Chinlechelys was determined to be a primitive genus, assigned as a relative of Proganochelys in Testudinata. Its armouring shows the evolution of the turtle carapace, and although some basal features like thin ribs suggest a more primitive placement. The cladogram below shows the suspected relationships of Chinlechelys, along with Pronganochelys, Kayentachelys and other basal turtles:

References

Chinle fauna
Prehistoric turtle genera
Testudinata